Veera Bhoga Vasantha Rayalu is a 2018 Telugu-language vigilante  thriller film directed by R. Inndrasena and produced by Appa Rao under Baba Creations banner. The film features an ensemble cast including Nara Rohit, Sudheer Babu, Shriya Saran, and Sree Vishnu. The film released on 26 October 2018 to a negative critical reception and commercial failure. This film is dubbed in Tamil in the name "Kannula Thimiru" by Star Vijay channel.

Plot 
The story opens with Sub-Inspector Vinay Rao (Sudheer Babu) receiving a complaint from a young boy (Master Charith Manas) who claims that his house, along with his parents inside, has gone missing. The claim is validated when Vinay finds that house no. 143 in the colony, the boy’s house, is missing. Dr. Surya (Ravi Prakash), is a medical practitioner who sponsors an orphanage in the city. A girl from the orphanage goes missing, but the Circle-Inspector (Anantha Prabhu) does not take the case seriously and rebukes Surya. A passenger flight commuting from Colombo to India goes missing, and Deepak Reddy (Nara Rohith) is appointed as the head of the Investigation Unit.

Constable Ramarao (Shashank), a part-time private investigator, offers to help Dr. Surya find the missing girl, but this results in the latter getting threatening calls from the kidnapper. Deepak Reddy receives a call from a man, identifying himself as Veera Bhoga Vasantha Rayalu (Sree Vishnu), who claims to have hijacked the missing flight and asks for Inspector Neelima (Shriya Saran). Neelima reveals that there has been a string of serial killings of criminals in the recent past that were linked to a man who identified himself by the same name. Veera Bhoga Vasantha Rayalu demands that in exchange for the release of the 300 hostages, Deepak and his team has to execute a Pan-Indian mission of simultaneously killing 300 criminals. The government accepts the condition and arrangements for the operation are made. Vinay’s constables discover a key that opens the lock to an old dilapidated house, and the team plan to break into the house, where they believe the kidnappers of the young boy’s parents reside. Ramarao discovers that an entire racket is at work in kidnapping poor and orphaned young girls, and follows the kidnappers while they are kidnapping another girl, but is discovered and taken to Dr. Surya’s house, where Ramarao, Surya and the latter’s wife are killed by the kidnappers. Deepak discovers that Veera Bhoga Vasantha Rayalu’s claims of hijacking the flight were false after the flight’s remains were are found in the Indian Ocean, implying that the plane had crashed. Vinay and his team rescue the kidnapped girls and find the head of the kidnappers and gun him to death.

Deepak and his team are forced to go ahead with the operation after realizing Veera Bhoga Vasantha Rayalu has another set of 300 individuals as hostages. Meanwhile, a man dressed in a Santa Claus outfit murders the girls Vinay and his team had rescued. Dr. Surya’s orphaned son, Nikhil (Master Snehith), who was admitted at the orphanage, runs away and dresses up as a girl, hoping to discover the kidnappers, and is successfully taken away. Vinay discovers that his father has committed suicide. Veera Bhoga Vasantha Rayalu, instead of releasing, burns the kidnapped hostages, who are later revealed to also have been criminals. The team manage to find a sketch of his appearance, and trace his location. Meanwhile, Vinay realizes that the house has not gone missing, rather the number plates outside all the houses have been changed to make it look like the boy’s house has gone missing. The corpses of the boy’s parents are also discovered. Nikhil escapes from his kidnappers after being discovered. Vinay discovers that the young boy was the one responsible for the murder of his parents, the forging of the missing house, as well as the suicide of his father. It is revealed at this juncture that the story takes place in 3 different timelines;Veera Bhoga Vasantha Rayalu, Nikhil and the boy are all revealed to be the same person. It is revealed that Vinay’s father, the negligent Circle Inspector, was the head of the kidnappers’ racket that killed Dr. Surya. Years later, the kidnappers themselves adopted Nikhil from the orphanage, not realizing who he was, and were killed by him, which bought Nikhil to Vinay, and he blackmailed Vinay’s father into suicide.

In the present, Deepak, Neelima and an older Vinay corner Nikhil / Veera Bhoga Vasantha Rayalu to a dilapidated building, but the latter successfully escapes from there. An epilogue shows a much older Nikhil, and hints at a sequel.

Cast 

 Sree Vishnu as Nikhil / Veera Bhoga Vasantha Rayalu 
 Nara Rohit as Deepak Reddy
 Sudheer Babu as SI / DSP Vinay Rao
 Shriya Saran as Inspector Neelima
 Ravi Prakash as Dr. Surya, Nikhil's father
 Shashank as Constable Ramarao also part time Private Investigator
 Srinivasa Reddy as Constable 403
 Manoj Nandam as Udhav
 Master Charith Manas as the young boy / 15 year old Nikhil
 Rajeswari as Dr. Surya’s wife
 Edida Sriram
 Anantha Prabhu as Circle Inspector Srinivasa Rao
 Giridhar as Investigation Unit Officer
 Naveen Neni as Constable 401
 Shashidar
 Master Snehith as young Nikhil
 Prasanth Karthi

Promotion 
The first look poster was released on 11 July 2018.

Soundtrack

The soundtrack was composed by Mark K Robin and released by Mango Music.

Reception

Critical reception 
The Times of India gave 2 out of 5 stars stating "Veera Bhoga Vasantha Rayalu is a film that tries to take on too much at once and fails at it".
IndiaGlitz gave 2 out of 5 stars stating "A multi-thread thriller gone wrong.  A misplaced narrative style and wrong kind of performances".

References

External links
 
 Facebook Official Page

2018 films
Indian crime thriller films
Indian films about revenge
Indian vigilante films
2010s Telugu-language films
Films about child trafficking in India
2018 crime thriller films
2010s vigilante films